The Lewistown Silk Stocking District is a  historic district in Lewistown, Montana which was listed on the National Register of Historic Places in 1985.

About  in area, the district is roughly bounded by 2nd Ave., Boulevard and Washington Sts. and 3rd Ave.  It included seven contributing buildings.

Architecture: Late Victorian, Georgian, Federal

It includes seven historic houses:
 Swietzer Residence (1919), 315 N. 3rd St.
Symmes Residence (1909), also known as Babin Residence, 220 W. Boulevard
Taylor Residence (1920), also known as St. Leo's Rectory
Waite Residence (1909)
Fred R. Warren Residence (1915), Fallen Residence, 210 W. Boulevard
Wiedeman Residence (1904), designed by architect C.E. Bell 
J.T. Wunderlin Residence (1905)

References

Historic districts on the National Register of Historic Places in Montana
National Register of Historic Places in Fergus County, Montana
Georgian architecture in Montana
Federal architecture in Montana
Victorian architecture in Montana